Football Club St Helens is a football club based in St. Helens, England. They are currently members of the North West Counties League Division One North and play at Windleshaw Sports, St. Helens.

History
Formed in 2014, following a split from St Helens Town reserves, the club initially entered the West Cheshire League, before joining the Cheshire League in 2015. In 2022, the club was admitted into the North West Counties League Division One North.

Ground
The club currently play at Windleshaw Sports, St. Helens.

References

Sport in St Helens, Merseyside
Association football clubs established in 2014
2014 establishments in England
Football clubs in England
Football clubs in Merseyside
West Cheshire Association Football League clubs
Cheshire Association Football League
North West Counties Football League clubs